Pneumocystis murina is a species of fungus, first isolated from laboratory mice, hence its name.

References

Further reading
Dagnæs-Hansen, Frederik, and Knud Poulsen. "Pneumocystis murina infection in immunodeficient mice in a closed barrier unit: a case report." Scand. J. Lab. Anim. Sci 38.2 (2011).

External links

MycoBank

Ascomycota
Parasitic fungi
Fungi described in 2004